Dixie (also Little Dixie) is an unincorporated community in Henderson County, Kentucky, United States.

Notes

Unincorporated communities in Henderson County, Kentucky
Unincorporated communities in Kentucky